This is a list of the main career statistics of professional Greek tennis player Maria Sakkari. Sakkari has won one singles title on the WTA Tour at the Morocco Open in 2019. She also has two WTA 1000 finals, both achieved in 2022; the Indian Wells Open and Guadalajara Open. In 2021, she reached her first Grand Slam semifinals at the French Open. In the same year later, she reached semifinals of the US Open as well. 

Sakkari finished season of 2021 playing at the year-end WTA Finals, becaming first Greek female player to do that. After passing group stage, she lost to Anett Kontaveit in the semifinals. In September 2021, right after reaching US Open semifinals, Sakkari made her debut into the top 10, becaming first Greek female player to achieve that goal. One year later, in March 2022, she has achieved a career-high singles ranking of world No. 3 in March 2022.

Performance timelines

P = postponed

Only main-draw results in WTA Tour, Grand Slam tournaments, Fed Cup/Billie Jean King Cup and Olympic Games are included in win–loss records.

Singles
Current after the 2023 Dubai Open.

Doubles
Current after the 2023 United Cup against Belgium.

Significant finals

WTA 1000 finals

Singles: 2 (2 runner-ups)

WTA career finals
Sakkari debuted at the WTA Tour in 2015 at the US Open as a qualifier. Since then, she has won one singles title and reached an additional six singles finals.

Singles: 7 (1 title, 6 runner-ups)

ITF Circuit finals
Sakkari debuted at the ITF Women's World Tennis Tour in 2010 at the $10K event in Mytilene in her homeland Greece. In singles, she has been in 17 finals and won seven of them, while in doubles she has been in nine finals and won five of them. Her biggest title on the ITF Tour was $75K Al Habtoor Challenge in doubles event in November 2015.

Singles: 17 (7 titles, 10 runner–ups)

Doubles: 9 (5 titles, 4 runner–ups)

WTA Tour career earnings
Correct through the 2022 Parma

Career Grand Slam statistics

Career Grand Slam seedings
The tournaments won by Sakkari are in boldface, and advanced into finals by Sakkari are in italics.

Best Grand Slam results details
Grand Slam winners are in boldface, and runner–ups in italics.

Record against other players

Record against top 10 players

 She has a  record against players who were, at the time the match was played, ranked in the top 10.

Double bagel matches (6–0, 6–0)

Notes

References

Sakkari, Maria